Kamergerskiy Pereulok or Chamberlain Lane is a short street with many historical buildings located within the Boulevard Ring in central Moscow. Almost all of the buildings on Chamberlain Lane are classified as architectural monuments.

The street runs from Tverskaya Street in the west to Bolshaya Dmitrovka Street in the east.

Artists 
The lane is associated with the life and work of many Russian cultural figures. Artists who lived on Chamberlain Lane include writers Vladimir Odoyevsky, Yuri Samarin, Leo Tolstoy, Yury Olesha, Mikhail Svetlov, Eduard Bagritsky, Lev Kassil, Mikhail Sholokhov, and Venedikt Yerofeyev; poet Novella Matveyeva; actors Vera Pashennaya, Vasily Kachalov, Alla Tarasova, Mark Prudkin, Nikolai Khmelyov, Sofya Giatsintova, Lyubov Orlova; painter Vasily Tropinin; and composer Sergei Prokofiev.

Gallery

References

Sources

 

Streets in Moscow